Wunstorf Air Base is a German Air Force military airfield (air base), located  south-southwest of Neustadt am Rübenberge and  north-northwest of Wunstorf in Lower Saxony, Germany. Wunstorf Air Base is the home to Air Transport Wing 62, a unit operating all German Airbus A400M Atlas.

History
The airfield was opened in 1936 for the German Luftwaffe reconstituted by the National Socialist government in 1935. During the Second World War, it was seized by the British Army on 7 April 1945, in a fierce battle by elements of the 5th Parachute Brigade, 6th Airborne Division.  During the battle, in which the 13th Battalion was also engaged, the 7th (Light Infantry) Parachute Battalion lost six killed, and 21 wounded, most from the initial ambush of the four leading trucks of B Company. The airfield was captured with 19 Bf 109s, four Fw 190s, two Ju 88s, two Ju 52s and much other valuable equipment.

After the battle, the base was taken over by the Royal Air Force (RAF), including Canadian (RCAF) Wing 126 of the British 2nd Tactical Air Force, and designated as Advanced Landing Ground B-116 Wunstorf.

The airfield features heavily in the book "13 - Lucky For Some", which is about the history of the 13th (Lancashire) Parachute Battalion. There are many then and now photographs as well as maps and diagrams of battles that took place in the region.

It was later designated RAF Wunstorf and used by Royal Air Force Germany.   RAF units assigned were:

 April 1947 - June 1950: 2 Sq with Spitfire F 14/PR 19
 1950-1952: 4 Sq, 26 Sq with Vampire FB 5 later FB9
 August 1950 - September 1955: 11 Sq with Vampire FB 5, later Venom FB 1, later FB 4
 March 1952 - October 1955: 5 Sq with Vampire FB 5, later Venom FB 1, later FB 4
 July 1952 - October 1955: 266 Sq with Vampire FB 5, later Venom FB 1, later FB 4
 November 1955 - September 1956: 79 Sq with Meteor FR 9 and Swift FR 5
 November 1955 - September 1957: 541 Sq with Meteor PR 10
 1956-1957: 5 Sq, 11 Sq, 266 Sq with Venom FB 4

Much of the 1951 novel Air Bridge by Hammond Innes is set in RAF Wunstorf at the time of the Berlin Airlift. The novel contains descriptions of how the airfield, rapidly expanded for the Airlift, looked at that time.

The then-RAF Wunstorf also featured in the 1957 film "High Flight". Also in 1957, the airfield returned to the control of the German Air Force and became a NATO air base.

Use by German Air Force

German Air Force first stationed Nord Noratlas which by 1971 were replaced by Transall C-160D; those were disbanded from the local Air Transport Wing 62 (LTG 62) in July 2015, now focussing on accepting and integrating Airbus A400M Atlas. Flight training for decades was executed using Dornier Do 28.

Motorsport

Between 1964 and 1998, a temporary motor racing circuit was laid out on the Wunstorf airbase. Races at the circuit were included in the German Touring Car Championship between 1984 and 1993, one of several temporary airfield tracks on the DTM calendar at the time. The series eventually began to move towards permanent racing facilities and the final DTM race at Wunstorf took place in 1993, where Nicola Larini set a lap record of 1:44.45 in his Alfa Romeo during qualifying.

In 1977, the Wunstorf circuit was first used for a round of the Interserie sports car racing championship. Wunstorf hosted the Interserie between 1977 and 1979, and again between 1985 and 1990.

Besides the big-name national championships, Wunstorf hosted a series of annual club racing meetings until 1999, when motor racing on the airbase premises was finally halted due to the cost of preparation and administration for the events.

Lap records 

The official race lap records at the Wunstorf Air Base Circuit are listed as:

Expansion in 2010's
As preparation for 40 Airbus A400M Atlas to be stationed at Wunstorf Air Base, the airbase underwent major expansion. Parking positions were expanded, one maintenance hangar was erected, another one is under construction. A building to house the flight simulator has been added.

References

Bibliography
 World Aero Data Wunstorf
 Military Airfield Directory Wunstorf Airbase 
 Wunstorf and Neustadt April 1945
 Innes, Hammond, Air Bridge, (London, 1951)

 Johnson, David C. (1988), U.S. Army Air Forces Continental Airfields (ETO), D-Day to V-E Day; Research Division, USAF Historical Research Center, Maxwell AFB, Alabama.

External links

Bases of the German Air Force
Airports in Lower Saxony